Frederick Viggers Smith (1912–2006) was an Australian/British psychologist.

Academic career
After training as a teacher, Smith completed a BSc in Psychology at the University of Sydney. He then moved to the UK where he obtained a PhD from the University of London in 1948. He was appointed as a lecturer at Birkbeck College and then at the University of Aberdeen. In 1950 he was appointed Professor of Educational Psychology at Durham University and subsequently Chair of Psychology. He retired in 1976.

Publications
 Smith, F.V. Explanation of Human Behaviour
 Smith F.V. Attachment of the Young: Imprinting and Other Developments 
 Smith, F.V. Purpose in Animal Behaviour

Awards
 Fellow, British Psychological Society
President, British Psychological Society, 1959–60

References 

1912 births
2006 deaths
Academics of Durham University
University of Sydney people
British psychologists
Fellows of the British Psychological Society
Presidents of the British Psychological Society
20th-century psychologists
Australian emigrants to the United Kingdom